Akeem Spence (born November 29, 1991) is an American football defensive tackle who is a free agent. He was drafted by the Tampa Bay Buccaneers in the fourth round of the 2013 NFL Draft. He played college football at Illinois.

Early years
Spence was born in Navarre, Florida. He attended Fort Walton Beach High School, and played for the Fort Walton Beach Vikings high school football team. He recorded 80 tackles and five sacks as a senior and helped lead team to a 10-2 record and district championship. Posted 67 tackles, 16 tackles for loss and two sacks in 2007 as a junior. Rated as a three-star recruit by Rivals.com, he accepted an athletic scholarship from the University of Illinois over offers from Iowa State and Syracuse.

College career
While attending the University of Illinois at Urbana–Champaign, Spence played for the Illinois Fighting Illini football team from 2009 to 2012. After redshirting in 2009, he started all 13 games at defensive tackle alongside All-American Corey Liuget. He had 45 tackles, four tackles for a loss, one quarterback sacks, two hurries and one fumble recovery on the season. In 2011, he started all 13 games on the season, he finished ranked fourth on the team with 69 tackles on the season, including 5.5 tackles for a loess and 1.5 sacks. As a redshirt junior, he started all 12 games in 2012 and started all 38 games of his college career at defensive tackle. He ranked third on the team in tackles with 72 and tied for second on team with 7.0 tackles for a loss and had one sack.

Spence announced on December 19, 2012 that he would forgo his senior season and enter the NFL Draft.

Professional career

Tampa Bay Buccaneers
On April 27, 2013, Spence was drafted by the Tampa Bay Buccaneers in the fourth round (100th overall pick) of the 2013 NFL Draft. The Buccaneers signed him to a rookie contract on May 15, 2013. Spence signed his contract on May 15, 2013, a four-year deal that's worth $2,644,424. Spence collected a $484,424 signing bonus.

On December 26, 2015, the Tampa Bay Buccaneers placed Spence on injured reserve.

Detroit Lions
On March 10, 2017, Spence signed a three-year, $9 million contract with the Detroit Lions. He started 11 games during the 2017 season, recording 39 tackles, three sacks and a forced fumble. Spence was named the 2017 recipient of the Detroit Lions Media-Friendly Good Guy Award by the Detroit chapter of the PFWA and Detroit Sports Media Association.

Miami Dolphins
On May 3, 2018, Spence was traded to the Miami Dolphins for a conditional 2019 seventh round pick, previously acquired from the Browns in a trade for Jarvis Landry.

On August 27, 2019, Spence was released from the Miami Dolphins.

Philadelphia Eagles
Spence signed a one-year contract with the Philadelphia Eagles on September 10, 2019. He was released after playing in six games on October 21, 2019.

Jacksonville Jaguars
On October 25, 2019, Spence was signed by the Jacksonville Jaguars.

New England Patriots
On November 21, 2020, the New England Patriots signed Spence to their practice squad. He was elevated to the active roster on November 28 for the team's week 12 game against the Arizona Cardinals, and reverted to the practice squad after the game. On December 5, 2020, Spence was promoted to the active roster.

On August 31, 2021, Spence was released by the Patriots.

Washington Football Team
On December 16, 2021, Spence signed with the Washington Football Team. He was waived on December 24.

Denver Broncos
On December 28, 2021, Spence was signed to the Denver Broncos practice squad. His contract expired when the teams season ended on January 8, 2022.

San Francisco 49ers
On August 1, 2022, Spence was signed by the San Francisco 49ers. He was released on August 30, 2022 and signed to the practice squad the next day. He was promoted to the active roster on October 8. He was released on November 1, 2022. He signed back to the practice squad the next day. He was signed to the active roster on December 15, 2022. He was released on January 3, 2023. Spence was re-signed to the 49ers’ practice squad on January 6, 2023. His practice squad contract with the team expired after the season on January 29, 2023.

Personal life
On January 14, 2014, Spence was arrested in Flomaton, Alabama on charges of misdemeanor marijuana possession. He was later suspended one game by the NFL for the incident. During the 2017 NFL season, Spence participated in a protest during the national anthem. Following this, he reported that his father, a contractor, was denied work due to his protest.

References

External links
 Tampa Bay Buccaneers bio
 Illinois profile

1991 births
Living people
Navarre, Florida
American football defensive tackles
Illinois Fighting Illini football players
People from Fort Walton Beach, Florida
Players of American football from Florida
Tampa Bay Buccaneers players
Detroit Lions players
Miami Dolphins players
Philadelphia Eagles players
Jacksonville Jaguars players
New England Patriots players
Washington Football Team players
Denver Broncos players
San Francisco 49ers players